East Langwell is a small, remote crofting settlement in Rogart, Sutherland, Scottish Highlands and is in the Scottish council area of Highland.

West Langwell lies 2 miles directly northwest of East Langwell, and approximately 6 miles north of Golspie.

Notes

Populated places in Sutherland